Charles Sturtevant Randall (February 20, 1824 – August 17, 1904) was a member of the United States House of Representatives from Massachusetts.

Born in New Bedford, Massachusetts, on February 20, 1824; died in New Bedford, Massachusetts, August 17, 1904.  Randall is interred in the Rural Cemetery.

References

Notes

Republican Party Massachusetts state senators
Politicians from New Bedford, Massachusetts
1824 births
1904 deaths
Republican Party members of the Massachusetts House of Representatives
Republican Party members of the United States House of Representatives from Massachusetts
19th-century American politicians